Emperor Renzong of Song (30 May 1010 – 30 April 1063), personal name Zhao Zhen, was the fourth emperor of the Song dynasty of China. He reigned for about 41 years from 1022 to his death in 1063, and was the longest reigning Song dynasty emperor. He was the sixth son of his predecessor, Emperor Zhenzong, and was succeeded by his cousin's son, Zhao Shu who took the throne as Emperor Yingzong because his own sons died prematurely. His original personal name was Zhao Shouyi but it was changed by imperial decree in 1018 to "Zhao Zhen", which means 'auspicious' in Chinese.

Reign
His father Emperor Zhenzong died in 1022 leaving Renzong who was only 12 at the time as the new emperor. His stepmother Liu was the regent since he was young. In 1027, he was old enough to rule on his own but Liu refused to step down and ruled until her death. Compared to other famous Chinese emperors, Emperor Renzong was not widely known. His reign marked the high point of Song influence and power but was also the beginning of its slow disintegration that would persist over one and a half  centuries. One possible reason behind its weakness was its interpretation of its own foreign policy. The official policy of the Song Empire at the time was of pacifism and this caused the weakening of its military. The Tangut-led Western Xia state took advantage of this deterioration and waged small scale wars against the Song Empire near the borders.

In 1038, the Tangut chieftain Li Yuanhao named himself emperor of Da Xia and demanded Emperor Renzong recognise him as an equal. The Song court recognised Li Yuanhao as governor but not as "emperor", a title it regarded as exclusive to the Song emperor. After intense diplomatic contacts, in 1043 the Tangut state accepted the recognition of the Song emperor as emperor in exchange for annual gifts, which implied tacit recognition on the part of the Song of the military power of the Tanguts.

When Emperor Renzong came to power, he issued decrees to strengthen the military and paid massive bribes to the Khitan-led Liao dynasty, an adversary of Western Xia, in the hope that this would ensure the safety of the Song Empire. However, these policies involved a heavy price. Taxes were increased severely and the peasants lived in a state of perpetual poverty. This eventually caused organised rebellions to take place throughout the country and the breakdown of the Song government.

However, according to the records of History of Song, Renzong was considered to be merciful, tolerant, modest, lenient, and frugal, and seldom revealed his feelings on expressions. One popular folk story of him was about that Emperor Renzong felt hungry one night and was eager to eat mutton. When the servant was about to order the cooks to prepare it, Renzong stopped him and explained that this might cause wastage if the cooks kept cooking mutton from then on, and hence, he preferred to suffer from hunger rather than waste too much. Renzong ordered that officers of government must be very cautious in using the death penalty, and if an officer wrongly sentenced an innocent person to death even once, he would never be promoted. Renzong once said to his near ministers : "I have never used the word 'death' to scold others, how dare I abuse the death penalty?"

During Emperor Renzong's reign, the culture of Song Dynasty, especially literature, began to prosper. Many of the most famous literati and poets in Chinese history lived or started their creating careers during his reign, such as Fan Zhongyan, Ouyang Xiu and Mei Yaochen. In the 2nd year of Jiayou, the Imperial Examination enrolled some students who would become famous throughout China. The students included Su Xun, Su Shi, Su Zhe, Zeng Gong, etc. They became the most important literati in Chinese history and also began a new era of Chinese literature.

Emperor Renzong elevated the 46th-generation descendants of Confucius to the current title of Duke Yansheng. They were previously of lower noble ranks.

In 1054, Chinese astronomers recorded the explosion of SN 1054, a supernova.

In 1055, Emperor Renzong became critically ill and started to worry about having no successor because his sons all died prematurely. Acting on the advice of his ministers, Emperor Renzong agreed to bring two of his younger male relatives into his palace. One of them was Zhao Zongshi, the future Emperor Yingzong, who was eventually chosen and designated as the Crown Prince.

Renzong died of an illness in 1063 and was succeeded by Emperor Yingzong. Many people mourned his death, including the new Emperor Yingzong and, oddly enough, Emperor Daozong of Liao.

Legend
According to the 14th-century classical novel Water Margin, the first 27 years of Emperor Renzong's reign were known as the "Era of Three Abundances." But this was followed by a great plague around the year 1048 that decimated the population. It was only the prayers of the priests from the Taoist sect Way of the Celestial Masters that eventually lifted this pestilence. The imperial emissary who had been sent to the Taoist monastery recklessly entered the Suppression of Demons Hall, thinking the stories of demons was a hoax to delude gullible people.

Family

Consorts and Issue:
 Empress Guo Qingwu, of the Guo clan (1012–1035)
 Empress Cisheng, of the Cao clan (1016–1079)
 Empress Wencheng, of the Zhang clan (1024–1054)
 Princess Zhuangshun (1040–1042), third daughter
 Princess Zhuangqi (1042–1043), fourth daughter
 Princess Zhuangshen (1044–1045), eighth daughter
 Noble Consort Zhaojie, of the Miao clan (1017–1086)
 Princess Zhuangxiao (1038–1071), first daughter (also known as Princess Fukang)
 Married Li Wei (d. 1086)
 Zhao Xin, Prince Yong (1039–1041), second son
 Noble Consort Zhaoshu, of the Zhou clan (1022–1114)
 Princess Lingde (1058–1142), tenth daughter
 Married Qian Jingzhen of Wuyue, Prince Xianning (1043–1126) in 1067, and had issue (one son)
 Princess Yimu (d. 1112), 12th daughter
 Married Guo Xianqing in 1082
 Noble Consort Zhaoyi, of the Zhang clan
 Consort Shu, of the Dong clan (d. 1062)
 Princess Zhuangqi (1059–1067), ninth daughter
 Princess Xianyi (1059–1083), 11th daughter
 Married Cao Shi in 1076
 Princess Zhuangyan (1061), 13th daughter
 Consort De, of the Yu clan (d. 1064)
 Zhao Fang, Prince Yang (1037), first son
 Princess Zhuanghe (d. 1042), second daughter
 Consort De, of the Yang clan (1019–1073)
 Princess Zhuangxuan (1042), sixth daughter
 Consort Xian, of the Feng clan
 Princess Zhuangxi (1042–1043), fifth daughter
 Princess Zhuangyi (d. 1044), seventh daughter
 Talented Lady, of the Zhu clan
 Zhao Xi, Prince Jing (1041–1043), third son

Ancestry

See also
 Chinese emperors family tree (middle)
 List of emperors of the Song dynasty
 Architecture of the Song dynasty
 Culture of the Song dynasty
 Economy of the Song dynasty
 History of the Song dynasty
 Society of the Song dynasty
 Technology of the Song dynasty

References

[aged 52]

1010 births
1063 deaths
Northern Song emperors
11th-century Chinese monarchs
Child monarchs from Asia
People from Kaifeng
The Seven Heroes and Five Gallants characters
The Three Sui Quash the Demons' Revolt characters